Wall Luxury Essentials Ltd was a retailer of women's clothing and accessories. The company began as a shop in London's Notting Hill, before expanding into mail order in 1999, and e-commerce in 2000. Wall ceased trading in 2017.

History 
The company was founded in 1997 by Hernán and Judith de Balcázar when they opened a boutique in Notting Hill. In 1999, a mail order service was launched and a website the following year. The company ceased to trade in 2017. The company continued to exist until it was liquidated and ceased to exist as a company in 2019.

Community work
Throughout its history the company supported small businesses and charities in Peru by offering internships and by raising funds.

In March 2011, the company was mentioned during a debate on ethical fashion at the House of Lords. Baroness Rendell of Babergh stated that Wall "set an example that could be a standard for [fashion] companies".

References

External links 
Business Ideas come in the oddest ways - The Telegraph, 2008-05-11

Mail-order retailers
British companies established in 1997
Clothing companies established in 1997
Clothing companies based in London
Clothing retailers of England
Clothing companies of England
1997 establishments in the United Kingdom